Woodmancote is a village in the Chichester district of West Sussex, England. It lies just off the B2147 road 2 miles (3.2 km) northeast of Emsworth. It should not be confused with the other West Sussex village of Woodmancote near Henfield. At the 2011 Census the population of this village was included in the civil parish of Westbourne.

Villages in West Sussex
Chichester District